The 2016–17 McNeese State Cowboys basketball team represented McNeese State University during the 2016–17 NCAA Division I men's basketball season. The Cowboys were led by 11th-year head coach Dave Simmons and played their home games at Burton Coliseum in Lake Charles, Louisiana as members of the Southland Conference. They finished the season 7–22, 4–14 in Southland play to finish in last place. They failed to qualify for the Southland tournament.

Previous season 
The Cowboys finished the 2015–16 season with a record of 8–21, 6–12 in Southland play to finish in eighth place. They lost to Nicholls State in the first round of the Southland tournament.

Roster

Schedule and results
Source

|-
!colspan=9 style=|Non-conference regular season

|-
|-
!colspan=9 style=|Southland regular season

See also
2016–17 McNeese State Cowgirls basketball team

References

McNeese Cowboys basketball seasons
McNeese State
McNeese State
McNeese State